Jasna Góra  is a village in the administrative district of Gmina Bogatynia, within Zgorzelec County, Lower Silesian Voivodeship, in south-western Poland, close to the Czech and German borders. Founded during the Piast dynasty in the 1300s, it was seized by Germany prior to its return in 1945.

References

Jasna Gora